Liam Polwart (born 2 April 1995) was a New Zealand rugby union player who currently plays as a hooker for  in New Zealand's domestic Mitre 10 Cup and for the  in the international Super Rugby competition.

Youth career

Polwart attended Sacred Heart College in Auckland and during that time was a New Zealand secondary schools Barbarians representative, he also went on to captain  at under-19 level before moving to the Bay of Plenty along with New Zealand under-20 team-mates Mitchell Karpik and Henry Stowers in late 2015.

Senior career

Polwart made his senior debut for the Bay of Plenty Steamers during the 2016 Mitre 10 Cup season and went on to make 6 appearances before injury curtailed his campaign.

Super Rugby

Despite having only made 6 senior appearances, Polwart was named in the  squad ahead of the 2017 Super Rugby season, where he would compete with All Blacks Hika Elliot and Nathan Harris for the number 2 jersey.

International

Polwart was a member of the New Zealand Under-20 side which competed in the 2015 World Rugby Under 20 Championship in Italy, making 5 appearances.

References

1995 births
Living people
New Zealand rugby union players
Rugby union hookers
Bay of Plenty rugby union players
People educated at Sacred Heart College, Auckland